Calvary Public Hospital Bruce is a public hospital located in Bruce, Australian Capital Territory serving the northern suburbs of Canberra. It is classified as a secondary care facility. The hospital is operated by Calvary Health Care ACT, a not-for-profit venture of Little Company of Mary Health Care (LCMHC) on behalf of the ACT Government and is integrated into the Territory's public healthcare system. Calvary was established in 1979. It is a teaching hospital affiliated with the Australian Catholic University, Australian National University and University of Canberra. The Calvary Private Hospital and Hyson Green Mental Health Clinic are co-located on the site and share many facilities with the public hospital.

History
An agreement between the Commonwealth Government and Corporation of the Little Company of Mary was reached on 22 October 1971 to construct and operate a public hospital providing up to 300 beds to service the Inner North and Belconnen districts in Canberra, to be located on a site in the new suburb of Bruce. The new hospital commenced operations in May 1979, with the ownership and operation of the hospital remaining largely unchanged following the transition to self-government of the Territory in 1988.

In 2007/2008 the hospital conducted a pilot Refugee Mentoring Program. This community program is designed to provide refugees to Australia with work experience and career information and promotes cross cultural understanding. The program was launched in June 2008 and is funded through LCMHC's national Community Benefit Program.

In 2009, amid concerns regarding the ACT hospital system reaching capacity the Territory Government investigated acquiring the hospital to bring it under full government ownership and control. The move was prompted by government concerns about control of its assets should it commit to investing in upgrading the existing hospital. However following public consultation and extensive negotiations with LCMHC in 2010, this proposal failed to eventuate and the existing operational agreements have been maintained. The Government projects medium term demand for another 400 hospital beds across Canberra and are now pursuing options to meet this including the construction of a new public hospital to be built in the northern suburbs, with some services separated and others shared with Calvary.

In May 2014, the ACT Government announced $19 million funding for the construction of a 700 space multi-story car park to relieve demand for parking at the hospital, as well as upgrading the hospital's electrical sub-station to allow for expansion of clinical services offered on the campus.

Calvary hospital was among the earliest institutions in Australia to undertake sentinel lymph node biopsy procedures under the guidance of prominent local breast cancer surgeon Dr. John Buckingham.

Services
Calvary hospital provides services including:
Emergency department
Intensive Care Unit
Reconstructive surgery
General medicine and surgery
Mental Health
Obstetrics, Gynecology and Neonatology
Rheumatology
Cardiology
Endocrinology
Gastroenterology and respiratory care
Urology
Neurology
Ophthalmology
Orthopaedics
Oncology and breast cancer nursing services
Pastoral Care

The Bruce campus is also home to a variety of outpatient and Allied Health services which operate in conjunction with the hospital. Due to moral concerns of the Catholic church, the agreement under which the hospital operates allows that certain procedures including In vitro fertilisation and induced abortions not be performed at Calvary.

Statistics

In the 2011–12 financial year, Calvary Hospital conducted 4,691 elective surgeries and handled 53,650 Emergency Department presentations. Waiting times were significantly longer than national averages and comparable hospitals in all measures except for urgent emergencies, where the hospital performed to an average standard, and urgent elective surgeries where according to the Australian Government's My Hospital website 97% of patients were treated within clinically recommended timeframes, compared to an average of 92% at comparable hospitals.

See also
List of hospitals in Australia
List of hospitals in the Australian Capital Territory

References

Hospital buildings completed in 1979
Hospitals in the Australian Capital Territory
Teaching hospitals in Australia
Hospitals established in 1979
Buildings and structures in Canberra
1979 establishments in Australia